To cry is to shed tears.

Cry, The Cry or Cries may also refer to:

Arts, entertainment, and media

Films 
 The Cry (1957 film), a 1957 Italian black-and-white film
 The Cry (1964 film), a 1964 Czech film
 The Cry (2007 film), a 2007 horror film

Television
 The Cry (2002 TV series), a 2002 British TV series
 The Cry (2018 TV series), a 2018 Australian-British TV series

Music

Albums
 Cry (Alastair Galbraith album), 2000
 Cry (Cigarettes After Sex album), 2019
 Cry (Faith Hill album), 2002
 Cry (Lynn Anderson album), 1972
 Cry (Ronnie Dove album), 1967
 Cry (Simple Minds album), 2002
 The Cry (Steve Lacy album), recorded in 1988 and released in 1999
 The Cry!, a 1963 jazz album by Prince Lasha Quintet featuring Sonny Simmons

Songs
 "Cry" (Alex Parks song), 2004
 "Cry" (Ashnikko song), 2020
 "Cry" (Churchill Kohlman song), 1951, covered by Johnnie Ray and The Four Lads, Ronnie Dove, and others
 "Cry" (Dotter song), 2017 song by Swedish singer Dotter
 "Cry" (Dragon song), 1984 song by New Zealand-Australian rock band Dragon
 "Cry" (Faith Hill song), by Angie Aparo, 1999
 "Cry" (Godley & Creme song), 1985
 "Cry" (Just a Little), 2011 song by Dutch dance duo Bingo Players
 "Cry" (Kelly Clarkson song), 2010
 "Cry" (Kym Marsh song), 2003
 "Cry" (LL Cool J song), 2008
 "Cry" (Mandy Moore song), 2002
 "Cry" (The Mavis's song), 1998
 "Cry" (Michael Jackson song), 2001
 "Cry" (Sigma song), 2016
 "Cry" (The Sundays song), 1997
 "Cry" (Stellar single), 2016
 "Cry" (The Used song), 2014 song by American rock band The Used
 "Cry" (Waterfront song), 1988
 "Cry", a song by Conception, from their fourth studio album Flow (1997)
 "Cry", a song by Hilary Duff from her self-titled album (2004)
 "Cry", a song by James Blunt from Back to Bedlam (2004)
 "Cry", a song by Jay Sean from My Own Way (2008)
 "Cry.", a song by Mariah Carey from Me. I Am Mariah... The Elusive Chanteuse (2014)
 "Cry", a song by Mika from My Name Is Michael Holbrook (2019)
 "Cry", a song by Pharaoh from the album Bury the Light (2012)
 "Cry", a song by Reba McEntire from All the Women I Am (2010)
 "Cry", a song by Rihanna from the UK version of the album Good Girl Gone Bad (2007)
 "Cry", a song by Simple Minds from the album Cry (2002)
 "Cry", a song by System F from the album Out of the Blue (2001)
 "Cry", a song by That Handsome Devil from A City Dressed in Dynamite (2008)
"Cry", a song by Anne-Marie from Speak Your Mind (2018)
 "Cry", a song by Carly Rae Jepsen from the EP Emotion: Side B (2016)

Other uses in arts, entertainment, and media
 The Cry (book), a 1754 satirical novel
 The Cry or The Scream, an 1893 painting by Edvard Munch

Organizations
 Cardiac Risk in the Young, a charitable organization, based in the UK
 Child Rights and You, a worldwide non-profit organization
 CRY America, a non-profit organization in the United States

Science
 Cry protein, a delta-endotoxin produced by the bacterium Bacillus thuringiensis
 CRY1 and CRY2, Cryptochrome proteins in plants and animals

Other uses
 Cry, Yonne, a commune in France
 Crayford railway station, London, England (National Rail station code)

See also 
 Cry, the Beloved Country (disambiguation)
 Cry Cry Cry (disambiguation)
 "cryo-", meaning "cold" or "freeze": see 
 I Cry (disambiguation)
 I Cried (disambiguation)
 Crying (disambiguation)
 
 
 Cray, an American supercomputer manufacturer
 Krai, a Russian administrative district
 Kray (disambiguation)